Neritodryas is a genus of freshwater snails, (some of which are amphibious and terrestrial living on trees and bushes); they are gastropod mollusks in the family Neritidae, the nerites. 

The length of the shell is up to 40 mm.

Species
Species within the genus Neritodryas include:
 Neritodryas chimmoi (Reeve, 1856)
 Neritodryas cornea (Linnaeus, 1758) - type species of the genus Neritodryas
 Neritodryas dubia (Gmelin, 1791)
 † Neritodryas dutemplei (Deshayes, 1864) - synonym: Nerita dutemplei
 † Neritodryas globosa (J. de C. Sowerby, 1823) - synonym: Nerita globosa
 † Neritodryas guillioui Symonds & Pacaud, 2010
 Neritodryas javanica Eichhorst, 2016
 † Neritodryas laubrierei (Cossmann, 1888) 
 Neritodryas notabilis Riech, 1935
 Neritodryas simplex Schepman, 1919
 Neritodryas subsulcata (G. B. Sowerby I, 1836)

References 

  Brandt, R. A. M. (1974). The non-marine aquatic Mollusca of Thailand. Archiv für Molluskenkunde. 105: i-iv, 1-423.
 Eichhorst T.E. (2016). Neritidae of the world. Volume 2. Harxheim: Conchbooks. Pp. 696-1366

External links
 Martens, E. von. (1869). Über die Deckel der Schneckengattungen Neritina, Nerita, und Navicella. Sitzungsberichte der Gesellschaft naturforschender Freude zu Berlin. 1869: 21-23
 Cowie R.H. & Smith B.D. (2000). Arboreal neritidae. Veliger. 43(1): 98-102

Neritidae